Henry Meux may refer to:

Sir Henry Meux, 1st Baronet (1770–1841), of the Meux Baronets, British brewer
Sir Henry Meux, 2nd Baronet (1817–1883), British brewer and politician, son of the above
Sir Henry Bruce Meux, 3rd Baronet (1856–1900), British brewer, son of the above and husband of Valerie, Lady Meux